Karamojong may refer to:
 Karamojong people
 Karamojong language

Language and nationality disambiguation pages